Pattisson may refer to:

Hoël Pattisson (1905–1979), English cricketer
John Robert Ebenezer Pattisson (1844–1928), Royal Navy officer
Kenneth Pattisson (1916–2002), Royal Navy Fleet Air Arm pilot
Rodney Pattisson, MBE (born 1943), British yachtsman
Walter Pattisson (1854–1913), English amateur cricketer

See also
Cape Pattisson, headland in the northwest of Chatham Island, 800 km east of New Zealand's South Island
Patterson (surname)
Patteson
Pattison (disambiguation)